Emilio Fidel Vallez (born April 30, 1946) is a former American football tight end who played with the Chicago Bears of the National Football League. He played college football at New Mexico.

College football career 
Vallez played for the New Mexico Lobos from 1964 to 1967, lettering in his last three years.

On October 8, 1966, during a game against Arizona, Vallez caught an 89-yard pass from quarterback Rick Beitler, setting a New Mexico record for longest passing play at the time. As of 2017, this was still the third-longest passing play in New Mexico history.

Vallez also set New Mexico records for most receptions (17) and receiving yards (257) in one game during a 56–7 blowout win over UTEP on October 27, 1967. Both of these records still stood as of 2017.

In 1967, Vallez made first-team all-WAC and was the only New Mexico player that year who achieved that honor. He was also recognized as New Mexico's most valuable player that season.

NFL career 
Vallez was selected in the twelfth round of the 1968 NFL/AFL Draft by the Chicago Bears of the NFL. He played in nine games with the Bears over two seasons: six games in 1968 and three games in 1969.

Personal life 
Vallez is the uncle of KRQE news anchor Kim Vallez.

References 

1946 births
Living people
American football tight ends
Chicago Bears players
New Mexico Lobos football players
People from Socorro County, New Mexico
Players of American football from New Mexico